The  is Japanese aerial lift line in Nagatoro, Saitama.

It is the only line  operates. The company is a subsidiary of Chichibu Railway. Opened in 1961, the line climbs  of Chichibu Mountains. Cabins used for the line have not refurbished since its opening. Consequently, they are the oldest aerial lift cabins still used in Kantō region. At the summit, the company also operates a small zoo, a plum garden, and a wintersweet garden.

Basic data
System: Aerial tramway, 2 track cables and 1 haulage rope
Cable length: 
Vertical interval: 
Maximum gradient: 24°56′
Operational speed: 3.6 m/s
Passenger capacity per a cabin: 61
Cabins: 2
Stations: 2
Duration of one-way trip: 5 minutes 
One way cost: 480 yen (adults) 240 yen (children)

See also
List of aerial lifts in Japan

External links
 Official website

Aerial tramways in Japan
Chichibu Railway
1961 establishments in Japan